Triglochin striata is a plant native to New Zealand, South America, America, Africa, Australia and Southern Portugal. 

It is a perennial with parallel lines on its narrow linear leaves, which gives rise to its common name streaked arrow grass. Other common names include three-rib arrowgrass and three-ribbed arrow-grass.

Habitat
Triglochin striatas habitat is mainly coastal in damp muddy ground, salt marsh, estuaries, and damp seepages on coastal cliffs, boulder beaches and within damp coastal turf. It is also found inland around lake margins (in marginal turf communities) and in other suitable damp places, and sometimes even in tall forest.

References

External links
Jepson Manual Treatment
Photo gallery

Juncaginaceae
Flora of New South Wales
Flora of the Northern Territory
Flora of Queensland
Flora of South Australia
Flora of Tasmania
Flora of Victoria (Australia)
Angiosperms of Western Australia
Flora of North America